Erling Aas-Eng (born 9 January 1965) is a Norwegian politician for the Centre Party.

He served as a deputy representative to the Norwegian Parliament from Hedmark during the term 1993–1997.

On the local level, Aas-Eng was the mayor of Tolga from 2007 to 2011.

References

1965 births
Living people
Deputy members of the Storting
Centre Party (Norway) politicians
Norwegian College of Agriculture alumni
People from Tolga, Norway
20th-century Norwegian politicians